The giant talking catfish or giant raphael catfish (Megalodoras uranoscopus) is a species of thorny catfish that is native to the Amazon Basin in Bolivia, Brazil, Colombia, Ecuador and Peru. These fish are harvested in local commercial fisheries.

Ecology
M. uranoscopus occurs in small groups and occasionally forms schools. This mainly diurnal species inhabits rivers and feeds on the fruits of Licania longipetala and Astrocaryum jauari in addition to pulmonate snails.

Aquarium
This species is not commonly imported but it is appealing for its colour pattern which remains with age. Diet includes catfish pellets and tablets, prawns and frozen bloodworms. This species requires a large aquarium but is otherwise peaceful, hardy and compatible with most midsized to large fish. A group of three or more is ideal. The lighting should not be too bright. Hiding places should be provided for these fish.

References 
 

Doradidae
Fish of Bolivia
Freshwater fish of Brazil
Freshwater fish of Colombia
Freshwater fish of Ecuador
Freshwater fish of Peru
Fish of the Amazon basin
Fish described in 1888
Taxa named by Carl H. Eigenmann
Taxa named by Rosa Smith Eigenmann